Sam L. Orlich is a former member of the Wisconsin State Assembly.

Biography
Orlich was born on February 18, 1939, in Milwaukee, Wisconsin. He graduated from South Division High School before attending Milwaukee Area Technical College and the University of Wisconsin–Milwaukee. Orlich is married with two children.

Career
Orlich was elected to the Assembly in 1966. He is a Democrat.

References

Politicians from Milwaukee
Democratic Party members of the Wisconsin State Assembly
Milwaukee Area Technical College alumni
University of Wisconsin–Milwaukee alumni
1939 births
Living people
South Division High School alumni